Gustav Gierløff Klem (1898-1959) was a Norwegian forester.

Biography
Klem was born in Porsgrunn. He took the Dr. Agric. degree in 1937, and was a professor at the Norwegian Forest Research Institute from 1951 to his death. He was a co-founder of the periodical Norsk Skogbruk and the research institute Norsk Treteknisk Institutt.

References

1898 births
1959 deaths
Norwegian foresters
Forestry academics
People from Porsgrunn